Francisco Naranjo, O.P. (died 1655) was a Roman Catholic prelate who served as Bishop of Puerto Rico (1652–1655).

Biography
Francisco Naranjo was born in México and ordained a priest in the Order of Preachers. In 1652, he was appointed by the King of Spain and confirmed by Pope Innocent X as Bishop of Puerto Rico.  He served as Bishop of Puerto Rico until his death in 1655.

References

External links and additional sources
 (for Chronology of Bishops) 
 (for Chronology of Bishops) 

1655 deaths
Bishops appointed by Pope Innocent X
Dominican bishops
17th-century Roman Catholic bishops in Puerto Rico